Wilhelm Rein (31 March 1911 – 1 December 1994) was a South African cricketer. He played in five first-class matches from 1933/34 to 1947/48.

References

External links
 

1911 births
1994 deaths
South African cricketers
Border cricketers
Eastern Province cricketers